Jean Dadario Burke is an American television soap opera producer and director, most notably of the daytime television show All My Children. During her career in daytime television, Burke won many Daytime Emmy Awards, primarily as executive producer for that show. She is credited with saving many characters from the canceled soap opera Loving and transporting them to its sequel show, The City, by radically reworking the storyline, changing the setting to New York City, eliminating half of the cast, and bringing in the star Morgan Fairchild. She was part of a team that ultimately took the characters of Loving away from a "stilted upper-middle-class" orientation. She was instrumental in the careers of many daytime actors, including Josh Duhamel.

Burke was born in The Bronx, and started her career as a production secretary on the show Search for Tomorrow. She held numerous jobs in the soap opera industry, doing casting, directing, and writing, and sometimes working on several shows concurrently. She was a casting assistant at All My Children, was promoted to technical director, then later to director and senior producer, and finally to executive producer from 1998 to 2003. She was a director at Another World from 1988 to 1990. She was executive producer from 1995 to 1997 of the show The City. From 1994 to 1995, she was executive producer of the daytime show Loving. She was a director and associate producer of Ryan's Hope from 1988-1989.

Awards and nominations

Sources for awards:

References

External links

Soap opera producers
American television directors
Television producers from New York City
American women television producers
Living people
Year of birth missing (living people)
People from the Bronx
American women television directors
21st-century American women